Halamanning is a hamlet in west Cornwall, England, situated approximately  east of Penzance and  south of Hayle. Halamanning is in the parish of St Hilary (where the population taken at the 2011 census was included ) and is in the Cornwall and West Devon Mining Landscape, which was designated as a World Heritage Site in 2006.

References

External links

The Penwith Mining District - Halamanning; Cornwall in Focus

Hamlets in Cornwall